Lyon County School District serves Lyon County, Nevada.  The school district has 18 schools.

Schools

Elementary schools
Cottonwood Elementary School
Dayton Elementary School
East Valley Elementary School
Fernley Elementary School
Riverview Elementary School
Silver Stage Elementary School
Sutro Elementary School
Yerington Elementary School

Middle schools
Dayton Intermediate School
Fernley Intermediate School
Silverland Middle School
Silver Stage Middle School
Yerington Intermediate School

High schools
Dayton High School
Fernley High School
Silver Stage High School
Smith Valley Schools
Yerington High School

References

External links

Education in Lyon County, Nevada
School districts in Nevada